Kasum-Ismailov may refer to:
Goranboy (city), Azerbaijan
Qasım İsmayılov, Azerbaijan